Helgard Marzolf (born 19 November 1983) is a French female canoeist who won six medals at individual senior level at the Wildwater Canoeing World Championships and European Wildwater Championships.

She is the sister of the other canoeist Harald Marzolf.

References

1983 births
Living people
French female canoeists
Place of birth missing (living people)